Monjett Graham is a contemporary American artist and writer.

Biography and education
Monjett Graham, was born in Omaha, Nebraska, where he obtained a bachelor's degree from the University of Nebraska. His major was European and American History with a minor in Art. Monjett Graham then went on to complete his Master's thesis in Psychology and Art in 1974 from the Lone Mountain College. 
Graham continued his education at the University of Toronto, The San Francisco Institute of Art, and also attended The San Francisco Art Academy, focus was on Art.  
Monjett Graham is a daily practitioner of Transcendental Meditation, yoga and weight lifting.
He started these life-style features in the 1970s to increase his artistic productivity and relieve stress.
Working out five days a week, he is a certified personal trainer and specializes in strength training for adults.
His hobby is studying Chinese calligraphy which lead Monjett to move to Beijing China in the fall of 2012.

1970s
Monjett Graham moved to San Francisco, California in October 1969, from Omaha, Nebraska. In the early 1970s he wrote a regular column on culture for the Sun Reporter, an African American newspaper, located in San Francisco. He also contributed artwork to The Rip Off Review of Western Culture magazine/comic; two pieces were published in the first issue. The first drawing was entitled "Urban Mood" created with a single woodcut and pencil. The second drawing was created with woodcuts only, three soldiers, entitled "Occupation". The subject matter, at that time was social commentary and surrealistic landscapes. 
In 1970 Monjett Graham had his first one man exhibition, "The Fire Cycle" at the San Francisco College for Women. The college had changed its name in 1971 to the Lone Mountain College
Monjett Graham became an exhibiting member of the Blackman's Art Gallery on Haight Street in San Francisco, which was the first African American owned art gallery in Northern California.

Fantasy Landscapes
In 1976, Monjett moved from San Francisco to Sausalito, California and then a year later moved to Mill Valley, California.  In the mid-1970s Monjett Graham started "Fantasy Landscapes" series, which consisted of exotic or mysterious landscapes often punctuated by temples, pyramids or ancient buildings. Sometimes these paintings were accented with a single expressive character to embellish the scenario with specific attitude.

1980s
Monjett Graham created portraits of historical, military leaders from around the world, using pencil and conte as a medium. These drawings were then applied to T-shirts and sportswear via silk screen. This fashioned a marketable commodity, which involved a mail order business, complete with a color catalogue, that supplied retail buyers and sports shops across America. The business, incorporated in 1981, known as the "California Corporation" advertised in major nationwide magazines such as Soldier of Fortune, American Handgunner and Guns and Ammo. Eventually, it also included illustrations of warplanes and military vehicles. The business due to increased competition, ended in the late 1980s. 
During this time Monjett also expanded his artwork to a mixed media collage technique, which he used paper, thin bits of fabric on canvas. He would then experiment with larger objects, such as wood panel, leather, metal and plastic parts, as well as boots, and entire pieces of clothing. Starting out as abstract imagery, Monjett's mixed media collage technique evolved into illustrating animals and a variety of scenarios involving the human form.

1990s

Monjett Graham created several series of mixed media collage paintings throughout the 1990s. The first completed series was the "Music Series" which was first exhibited in 1991 at the Piazza Gallery in Sausalito, California. This is an ongoing series still in production, which portrays music in the United States as medium of stage entertainment. Other series done in the mixed media collage technique were the "Religion Series" and the "Sports Series" and the "Black Holocaust" series. The "Black Holocaust" series was exhibited in 1995 at Jahn Arts International in Minneapolis, Minnesota. The series illustrated the historical narrative of the West African slave trade.

Early 2000 Works of Art
Monjett has worked on the "Music Series" mixed media collage paintings and completed a series of paintings entitled "2010" which are all abstract expressionist paintings on canvas. Monjett Graham uses only three colors of acrylic paint with the "2010" series, and has worked with the paintings as if the canvas was an uneven, textured stone wall or cave interior. This can be seen here in the "Gold Rush" painting within this article.

2012
The ongoing study of Chinese calligraphy led Monjett to incorporate that ancient system of pictograms into the design of his abstract expressionist painting. In September 2012, Monjett exhibited, at the Joyce Gordon Gallery in Oakland California. These works of art were the first products of this unusual blending of style, technique and Chinese imagery into a series of colorful and rhythmic paintings. Completed in a specific order beginning with the abstract painting as a foundation, Monjett integrated the calligraphy character into the painting as it neared completion. As the series progressed the calligraphy figures evolved as larger and more dominant features of the paintings. The last few works of the series allowed the calligraphy to be the foundation of the paintings and even overflowing off the canvases so that only a portion of the Chinese characters are discernible. This dominant feature of one or more calligraphy characters, combined with colorful abstraction is the current direction of Monjett's abstract expressionist paintings. From his newly opened studio in Beijing China, Monjett is inspired, daily, to explore and open new pathways for the integration of Western Abstract painting and the ancient language and imagery of Chinese calligraphy

Exhibitions

References

External links 
Monjett Graham at the Joyce Gordon Gallery 
Marin News
 San Francisco Gate, Visual Art August 17, 2006
 Exhibits
The Rip Off Review of Western Culture, First Issue
Artist uses startling effects, Merced County Times, August 30, 1990
Artist turns trash into treasure, Merced Sun Star, August 31, 1990
Musical sinspiration rings true in paintings by Monjett Mill Valley Record, March 6, 1991
Art Notes, Marlene Tait, Mill Valley Literary Review, Summer 1991
Local artist combines "Light and Rhythm" to produce eclectic and original paintings, Marlene Tait, March 3, 1992
Visions of Light, Marlene Tait, Mill Valley Literary Review Spring 1992
Mixed media gets mythic, Humboldt Times Standard August 6, 1999
Pop Icons, Mythology And The Soul Humboldt Beacon August 12, 1990

American artists
1946 births
Living people